The following units and commanders fought in the Battle of Palo Alto on May 8, 1846, during the Mexican–American War.

U.S. Army
Zachary Taylor

Mexican Army
Mariano Arista

Sources
 suite101.com/article/the-battle-of-palo-alto-may-8-1846-a310891 Military Suite 101 site

Mexican–American War orders of battle